The abbreviation ICB may denote:

In finance 
Independent Commission on Banking
Industrial and Commercial Bank of Vietnam
Industry Classification Benchmark
Institute of Certified Bookkeepers
International Commercial Bank
Investment Corporation of Bangladesh
Iraqi Central Bank

In technology 
Institute for Collaborative Biotechnologies
InterConsult Bulgaria
Internet Citizen's Band
Immune checkpoint blockade
Information Control Block, in file systems

In music
Ice City Boyz, rap collective from London
a song by New Order from the album Movement

In other areas
Industrial Cape Breton
Industry Classification Benchmark
Infantry Combat Badge
Inner City Bypass, Brisbane
 Integrated care board, part of the integrated care system in the National Health Service of England
 Integrative and Comparative Biology, a journal
 International Children's Bible
International Conference on Bisexuality
International Crisis Behavior Project
Intracranial bleeding
Islamabad College for Boys
Islamic College of Brisbane, an Islamic school in Brisbane, Queensland, Australia